SS Harald Torsvik was a Liberty ship built in the United States during World War II. She was first named after Henry B. Plant, an American businessman, entrepreneur, investor involved with many transportation interests and projects, mostly railroads, in the southeastern United States. She was transferred to Norway after launching and renamed Harald Torsvik after Harald Torsvik, a Norwegian lawyer that aided refugees fleeing to England during World War II, he was captured by the Nazis and executed.

Construction
Henry B. Plant was laid down on 25 September 1944, under a Maritime Commission (MARCOM) contract, MC hull 2502, by the St. Johns River Shipbuilding Company, Jacksonville, Florida; and was launched on 28 October 1944.

History
She was transferred to Norway, under the Lend-Lease program, on 6 November 1944, and renamed Harald Torsvik. She was sold for commercial use, 10 October 1946, to Klaus Wiese Hansen, for $574,830.27, and renamed Grey County.

References

Bibliography

 
 
 
 

 

Liberty ships
Ships built in Jacksonville, Florida
1944 ships